Miguel Monteiro (born 23 December 2000) is a Portuguese Paralympic athlete specializing in shot put. He represented Portugal at the Paralympic Games.

Career
Monteiro represented Portugal in the men's shot put F40 event at the 2020 Summer Paralympics and won a bronze medal.

References

2000 births
Living people
People from Viseu
Medalists at the World Para Athletics Championships
Medalists at the World Para Athletics European Championships
Athletes (track and field) at the 2016 Summer Paralympics
Athletes (track and field) at the 2020 Summer Paralympics
Medalists at the 2020 Summer Paralympics
Paralympic bronze medalists for Portugal
Paralympic medalists in athletics (track and field)
Portuguese male shot putters
Sportspeople from Viseu District